Tadpangari is a village in Parbhani taluka of Parbhani district in Indian state of Maharashtra. Village has a health Sub-centre which works under Primary Health Centre of Daithana. Village is located on Parbhani-Gangakhed state highway.

Demography
As per 2011 census, Tadpangari had total population of 1,610 residing in 301 families, of which 841 were males while 769 were females. Average Sex ratio was 914 with 73.50% literacy rate. Male literacy was 84.73% while female literacy rate was 61.45%.

See also
 Daithana

References

Villages in Parbhani district